Founded in 1998 by Kevin Teasley, the Greater Education Opportunities (GEO) Foundation is a small but growing network of seven charter schools in Gary and Indianapolis, Indiana and Baton Rouge, Louisiana, serving 3,500 predominantly African-American and low-income students.

Mission 
A sign that hangs above the entrance to all GEO Academies reads, “Through these doors walk college graduates.” GEO Foundation believes that all children should have access to a quality education that includes college and that education can “Beat Poverty.”

To actualize these beliefs, GEO has systematically built a student-centered, content-rich K-12 educational model that provides a personalized and competency-based approach to learning necessary to close achievement gaps beginning in elementary schools, ensuring middle school students are on at least high school grade level by the summer before 9th grade, and ultimately preparing low-income students to begin college coursework on college campuses as early as 9th grade. By providing an accelerated pathway to college, beginning in kindergarten, GEO schools hope to break the cycle of poverty that is prevalent in the families and communities of the students we serve.

History 
Founded in 1998 by Kevin Teasley, GEO (Greater Education Opportunities) Foundation has radically altered the trajectory of impoverished students to succeed in college and career while still in high school through its innovative College Immersion Program.
Little more than 10% of the students that GEO serves in Gary through its flagship school 21st Century Charter School come from homes with any college experience. By contrast, 21C graduates earn an average of 19 college credits each, putting them in the top 5% of Indiana for college readiness. Nearly 30% of 21C 2020 graduates earned a full associate degree in high school.

In 2014, GEO’s success in Gary caught the attention of former Louisiana Superintendent of Education John White and an invitation by the Louisiana Department of Education to bring GEO’s college immersion model to Louisiana. Six years, four campuses, and 1,600 students later, GEO has earned the support of New Schools Baton Rouge and consistent “top gains” by the Louisiana Department of Education.
GEO Foundation supports a network of seven GEO Academies in Gary and Indianapolis, Indiana and Baton Rouge, Louisiana that serve 3,500 predominantly African-American and low-income students.

Publicity 
GEO Foundation has been nationally recognized for its impact. In May 2017, People magazine featured an article on a student who graduated from college before she received her high school diploma. In the year of 2007, the GEO foundation had a full page in Forbes magazine. News coverage and working with fellow foundations has been a factor for GEO. GEO has been the subject of two front-page stories in the New York Times, and there have been numerous news accounts in the Indianapolis Star, Denver Post, and Colorado Springs Gazette. Stanford University has published reports showing GEO Academies to be in the top 25% of the country in terms of academic growth.

U.S. Secretary of Education, Betsy DeVos, acknowledged the impact of GEO’s distinctive College Immersion model in a September 2017 visit to 21st Century Charter School at Gary. Part of her “Rethink School” national tour, highlighting innovative school models and pedagogical techniques, the visit included tours of classrooms and panels with parents, community members, and educators. Joining Secretary DeVos on the panel was Raven Osborne, GEO’s first student to earn a Bachelor’s degree prior to high school graduation. DeVos credited GEO Foundation leaders and school administrators and teachers for being creative and “expand[ing] student-centered education opportunities.”  Her visit was noted in the NWI Times.
 
In addition, two of the nation’s most prominent think tanks recently produced reports highlighting the success of GEO’s “dual credit with a purpose” model: the Center on Reinventing Public Education (CRPE) in its “Rethinking Career Technical Education,” and the American Enterprise Institute published a study in May 2019 entitled, “A Small School with Big Chances”: The 21st Century Charter School at Gary.”

Board of directors 

 Jeff Ready - Chair - CEO, Scale
 Tom Zupancic - Treasurer - Senior Vice President, Indianapolis Colts
 John Gottsman - President & CEO, The Clarity Group
 Joan Lange - Managing Director, Slick Rock Capital Partners
 Kevin Teasley - President/CEO, GEO Foundation
 Bill Smith - President and CEO, Sextons Creek

References

External links
GEO Foundation

Charter schools in the United States